Ruka bez povratka (A hand with no return) is the third studio album by the Serbian alternative rock band Veliki Prezir, released by B92 in 2005.

Track listing 
All tracks written and arranged by Vladimir Kolarić, except track 1, co-written with Boris Mladenović, Robert Telčer, track 4,  co-written with Telčer, and track 9, co-written with Mladenović.

Personnel

Veliki Prezir 
 Vladimir Kolarić — guitar, vocals, synthesizer [Dx7], synthesizer [moog]
 Robert Telčer — guitar, backing vocals, synthesizer [moog]
 Dušan Ševarlić — bass, synthesizer [Dx7], producer [track 6 & 10]
 Robert Radić — drums

Additional personnel 
 Ivan Brusić — mastered by, engineer [post production]
 Boris Mladenović — producer, guitar [track 1], keyboards [track 9]
 Dejan Vučetić — synthesizer [track 4]
 Draga Antov — vocals [track 9]

References 
 Ruka bez povratka at Discogs
 EX YU ROCK enciklopedija 1960-2006, Janjatović Petar; 

2005 albums
Veliki Prezir albums
Alternative rock albums by Serbian artists